Rabi crops or 
rabi harvest, also known as winter crops, are agricultural crops that are sown in winter and harvested in the spring in India, Pakistan and Bangladesh. The complimentary of the rabi crop is the kharif crop, which is grown after the rabi and zaid (zaa-id) crops are harvested one after another respectively.

Etymology
The words kharif and rabi have their origins in Arabic. These came to be used in India with the ascent of the Mughal empire in the Indian subcontinent and have been widely used ever since. The term is derived from the Arabic word for "spring", which is used in the Indian subcontinent, where it is the spring harvest (also known as the "winter crop").

Rabi season in India
The rabi crops are sown around mid-November, preferably after the monsoon rains are over, and harvesting begins in April / May. The crops are grown either with rainwater that has percolated into the ground or using irrigation. Good rain in winter spoils the rabi crops but is good for kharif crops.

The major rabi crop in India is wheat, followed by barley, mustard, sesame and peas. Peas are harvested early, as they are ready early: Indian markets are flooded with green peas from January to March, peaking in February.

Many crops are cultivated in both kharif and rabi seasons. The agriculture crops produced in India are seasonal in nature and highly dependent on these two monsoons. The table below contains a list of differences between the three cropping seasons in India.

The Indian government also offers Minimum Support Price for these crops, so that the farmers can be benefited from the harvest.

Common rabi crops

Cereals
 barley
 gram
 rapeseed
 mustard
 oat (Avena sativa)
 Wheat

 Linseed

Fruits
List as follows. These are rabi harvests rather than crops as that term is usually applied to annuals and not perennials:
 banana
 ber
 date
 grape
 grape fruit
 guava
 kinnow
 lemon
 lime
 mandarin orange
 mangoes
 mulberries
 orange

Legumes / lentils (dal) 
 chickpea
 kulthi (horse gram)
 lobias
 masoor
 mung bean
 pigeon pea
 toria
 Urad bean

Seed plants
 alfalfa (also known as lucerne, Medicago sativa)
 coriander (Coriandrum sativum, L)
 cumin (Cuminum cyminum, L)
 fenugreek (Trigonella foenumgraecum, L)
 linseed
 mustard (Brassica juncea L.)
 isabgol (Plantago ovata)
 sunflower
 Bengal gram
red gram 
black pepper

Vegetables

 bean
 beetroot (chukunder) 
 brinjal (baingan) 
 broccoli (hari gobhi) 
 cabbage (patta gobhi) 
 capsicum  
 carrot (gajar)
 cauliflowers (gobhi) 
 chickpea (also known as gram, Cicer arientinum) (channa)
 fenugreek (methi) 
 garlic (lehsun)
 lady finger (bhendi)
 lettuce (salad gobhi) 
 pea (mattar) 
 onion (Allium cepa, L.) (pyaj)
 potato (Solanum tuberosum) (urulai kizhangu) (aloo)
 radish (mooli)
 spinach (palak)
 sweet potato (shakarkand)
 tomato (Solanum lycopersiucum, L) (tamatar) (thakkali)
 turnip (shalgum)

Others
 tobacco

See also
 Zaid crops, a minor cropping season (summer) in the Indian Subcontinent
Kharif crop, a major cropping season based on the Arriving Monsoon in the Indian Subcontinent
Cash crop

References

External links
India: 2003/04 Rabi Crop Assessment, US Department of Agriculture

Crops
Agriculture in India
 Agriculture in Pakistan